This article lists spokespersons of Democratic Action Party (DAP) of Malaysia in the 13th Parliament issued on 19 May 2015. All DAP MPs elected in the 13th Parliament were in list except Lim Kit Siang, Lim Guan Eng and Tan Seng Giaw.

Frontbenchers

Backbenchers

References

See also 

 Opposition (Malaysia)
 Shadow Cabinet of Malaysia

Opposition of Malaysia
Politics of Malaysia